Hahold (III) from the kindred Hahót (fl. 1226–39) was a Hungarian noble, who served as ispán of Vas County from 1237 to 1239.

Hahold III was born into the Hahold branch of the gens Hahót as the son of Hahold II (fl. 1192) and his unidentified first wife. He had a brother, Michael I. Their father married for the second time, which marriage produced further three sons: Ákos, Nicholas I and Denis I.

References

Sources

 

13th-century Hungarian people
Hahold 03